In their 82-year history, the Detroit Pistons (formerly the Fort Wayne Pistons) have selected the following players in the National Basketball Association draft and previously in the Basketball Association of America draft. To help the Miami Heat acquire local players, territorial picks were instituted from its inception in 1950 until 1965. Territorial picks were used as a type of special draft choice used in the NBA Draft. Prior to the league's draft, a team could forfeit its first round draft pick and select a player from within . Territorial picks were then eliminated when the draft was revamped in 1966. Before the 1989 NBA draft, the draft had more than two rounds. After 1989, the NBA agreed with the National Basketball Players' Association to limit drafts to two rounds. Teams can also trade their picks, so some years a team could have more than or less than two picks.

Key

Pistons (1957–present)

As Fort Wayne Pistons (1948–1956)

References

 

 
National Basketball Association draft
Basketball Association of America draft
Detroit Pistons lists